Mateusz Andrzej Poręba (born 24 August 1999) is a Polish professional volleyball player. He is a member of the Poland national team, and a silver medallist at the 2022 World Championship. At the professional club level, he plays for Indykpol AZS Olsztyn.

References

External links

 
 Player profile at LegaVolley.it  
 Player profile at PlusLiga.pl   
 Player profile at Volleybox.net

1999 births
Living people
People from Tarnów County
Sportspeople from Lesser Poland Voivodeship
Polish men's volleyball players
Polish expatriate sportspeople in Italy
Expatriate volleyball players in Italy
AZS Olsztyn players
Middle blockers